Justin Robinson (born October 12, 1997) is an American professional basketball player for the Illawarra Hawks of the National Basketball League (NBL). He played college basketball for the Virginia Tech Hokies.

Early life and high school career
Robinson grew up in Manassas, Virginia. As a child, his family held season tickets for the Washington Wizards. He originally attended Montrose Christian School in Rockville, Maryland, playing basketball mostly as a reserve player and was a teammate of future NBA player Justin Anderson. He transferred to St. James School, Maryland before his junior year following the resignation of Montrose Christian's head coach, Stu Vetter. He immediately became a starter at St. James and averaged 13 points and six assists per game in his junior season. As a senior, Robinson averaged 21.8 points, 7.7 assists, 4.3 rebounds and 2.2 steals per game and was named the Washington County Player of the Year, Gatorade Maryland Boys Basketball Player of the Year, and a Parade All-American. He was rated a three-star recruit by ESPN,  247Sports and Rivals.com and committed to play college basketball at Virginia Tech over offers from UNLV and Providence.

College career

Robinson played four seasons for the Virginia Tech Hokies. He entered the starting lineup during his freshman season, averaging 7.3 points and 2.8 assists per game in 35 games (19 starts). In his first full season as a sophomore, Robinson averaged 10.4 points, 4.9 rebounds and 3.2 assist per game. As a junior, Robinson averaged 14 points and 5.6 assists (tied for second in the conference) and was named second team All-Atlantic Coast Conference. He averaged 13.5 points, 5.0 assists, and 3.2 rebounds while shooting 41.8% from three in 24 games in his senior season, missing 12 games due to a foot injury. He was named the ACC Player of the Week on January 28, 2019 after scoring 35 points with eight assists in a 78–56 win over Syracuse. Robinson finished his career with 1,383 career points and a school-record 562 assists. He participated in the Portsmouth Invitational Tournament following his senior season, averaging 7.7 points and six assists in three games played.

Professional career

Washington Wizards (2019–2020)
After going undrafted in the 2019 NBA Draft, Robinson agreed to a three-year contract as an undrafted free agent with the Washington Wizards and was named to the team's Summer League roster. He averaged 8.8 points 4.0 assists in five Summer League games, all starts. Robinson officially signed with the Wizards on July 12, 2019. On October 23, 2019, Robinson made his debut in NBA, coming off from bench in a 100–108 loss to the Dallas Mavericks. Robinson averaged 1.4 points per game in nine games. Robinson was waived by the Wizards on January 5, 2020.

Delaware Blue Coats (2020–2021)
On January 21, 2020, the Delaware Blue Coats announced that they had acquired Robinson off waivers. On February 21, Robinson tallied 22 points, four rebounds and three assists over 33 minutes in a loss to the Canton Charge. He missed a game against the Wisconsin Herd on February 28 with a shoulder injury.

On December 6, 2020, Robinson signed with the Philadelphia 76ers. On December 7, he was waived by the 76ers. Robinson later re-joined the Delaware Blue Coats in January 2021. In 13 games, he averaged 5.5 points, 3.4 rebounds, 5.9 assists and 1.62 steals in 31.1 minutes while shooting 40.5 percent from three point range, helping the Blue Coats reach the NBA G League Final.

Oklahoma City Thunder (2021)
On April 5, 2021, the Oklahoma City Thunder signed Robinson to a 10-day contract. On April 15, he signed a second 10-day contract.

Milwaukee Bucks (2021)
Robinson joined the Los Angeles Lakers for the 2021 NBA Summer League.

On September 15, 2021, Robinson signed with the Milwaukee Bucks, on a two-way contract with the Wisconsin Herd. However, he was waived on November 30, after appearing in 17 games.

Sacramento Kings (2021)
On December 17, 2021, Robinson signed a 10-day contract with the Sacramento Kings.

Detroit Pistons (2021–2022)
On December 28, 2021, Robinson signed a 10-day contract with the Detroit Pistons.

Robinson joined the Utah Jazz for the 2022 NBA Summer League.

Illawarra Hawks (2022–present)
On August 10, 2022, Robinson signed with the Illawarra Hawks of the Australian National Basketball League for the 2022–23 season. He made his debut in the season opener but was then subsequently ruled out for the rest of the season after suffering a meniscus tear in his right knee.

On January 31, 2023, Robinson re-signed with the Hawks for the 2023–24 NBL season.

Career statistics

NBA

Regular season

|-
| style="text-align:left;"|
| style="text-align:left;"|Washington
| 9 || 0 || 5.4 || .417 || .600 ||  || .6 || .8 || .0 || .1 || 1.4
|-
| style="text-align:left;"|
| style="text-align:left;"|Oklahoma City
| 9 || 0 || 9.8 || .333 || .286 || .600 || .8 || 1.0 || .3 || .0 || 2.3
|-
| style="text-align:left;"|
| style="text-align:left;"|Milwaukee
| 17 || 0 || 11.6 || .316 || .270 || 1.000 || .8 || 1.2 || .5 || .0 || 2.8
|-
| style="text-align:left;"|
| style="text-align:left;"|Sacramento
| 3 || 0 || 5.0 || .125 || .000 || – || .3 || .7 || .0 || .0 || .7
|-
| style="text-align:left;"|
| style="text-align:left;"|Detroit
| 5 || 0 || 18.2 || .321 || .381 || .333 || 1.4 || 1.8 || .2 || .2 || 5.6
|- class="sortbottom"
| style="text-align:center;" colspan="2"|Career
| 43 || 0 || 10.3 || .317 || .313 || .538 || .8 || 1.1 || .3 || .0 || 2.6

College

|-
| style="text-align:left;"|2015–16
| style="text-align:left;"|Virginia Tech
| 35|| 19 || 23.2 || .420 || .351 || .730 || 1.8 || 2.8 || .6 || .1 || 7.3
|-
| style="text-align:left;"|2016–17
| style="text-align:left;"|Virginia Tech
| 33 || 33 || 31.5 || .413 || .358 || .769 || 3.0 || 4.8 || .7 || .2 || 10.4
|-
| style="text-align:left;"|2017–18
| style="text-align:left;"|Virginia Tech
| 33 || 33 ||  30.9 || .464 || .398 || .782 || 2.8 || 5.6 || 1.2 || .1 || 14.0
|-
| style="text-align:left;"|2018–19
| style="text-align:left;"|Virginia Tech
| 24 || 20 || 29.5 || .473 || .418 || .811 || 3.2 || 5.0 || 1.6 || .1 || 13.5
|- class="sortbottom"
| style="text-align:center;" colspan="2"|Career
| 125 || 105 || 28.6 || .445 || .385 || .773 || 2.7 || 4.5 || 1.0 || .1 || 11.1

Personal life
Robinson's father, Verdell Robinson, played college basketball at the University of Charleston and was the head coach of Manassas Park High School for seven years.

References

External links
 Virginia Tech Hokies bio
 RealGM profile

1997 births
Living people
American expatriate basketball people in Australia
American men's basketball players
Basketball players from Virginia
Capital City Go-Go players
Delaware Blue Coats players
Detroit Pistons players
Illawarra Hawks players
Milwaukee Bucks players
Oklahoma City Thunder players
Parade High School All-Americans (boys' basketball)
People from Manassas, Virginia
Point guards
Sacramento Kings players
Saint James School (Maryland) alumni
Sportspeople from the Washington metropolitan area
Undrafted National Basketball Association players
Virginia Tech Hokies men's basketball players
Washington Wizards players
Wisconsin Herd players